Tricholepidion is a genus of wingless insect belonging to Zygentoma (silverfish and allies), with only a single described species T. gertschi, native to the northern coast of California in Western North America. It lives under dead bark and in rotting wood of conifers in mesophytic forests. It is alternatively considered the only living member of the family Lepidotrichidae, which also includes Lepidotrix from Eocene aged European amber, or the only member of the family Tricholepidiidae. The taxonomic position of Tricholepidion is uncertain, in some molecular phylogenetics studies it has been recovered as less closely related to flying insects (Pterygota) than the rest of Zygentoma is, rendering Zygentoma paraphyletic. Each compound eye contains ~40 ommatidia, and they have three ocelli. Scales on the body are absent. Unlike Archaeognatha and the other families of Zygentoma, which have three- and sometimes two-segmented tarsi, they have five-segmented tarsi like many winged insects.

References

Further reading

 
 

Insects
Monotypic insect genera
Articles created by Qbugbot